Constantine IV (also Constantine VI; , Western Armenian transliteration: Gosdantin or Kostantine; died 1373) was the King of Armenian Cilicia from 1362 until his death. He was the son of Hethum of Neghir, a nephew of Hethum I of Armenia. Constantine came to the throne on the death of his cousin Constantine III, whose widow, Maria, daughter of Oshin of Corycos, he married. 

Constantine formed an alliance with Peter I of Cyprus, offering him the port and castle of Corycus. On Peter's death in 1369, Constantine looked for a treaty with the Sultan of Egypt. The barons were unhappy with this policy, fearing annexation by the sultan, and in 1373 Constantine was murdered. Upon his death he was succeeded by his distant cousin Leo V, one of the Poitiers-Lusignan dynasty, who would become the last king of Cilician Armenia.

References

Year of birth missing
1373 deaths
House of Lusignan
Kings of the Armenian Kingdom of Cilicia
Hethumid dynasty